Josephulus is a genus of trilobites in the order Phacopida (family Pliomeridae) that existed during the upper Ordovician in what is now Sweden. It was described by Warburg in 1925, and the type species is Josephulus gracilis. The type locality was the Upper Leptaena Limestone.

References

External links
 Josephulus at the Paleobiology Database

Pliomeridae
Phacopida genera
Fossil taxa described in 1925
Ordovician trilobites
Fossils of Sweden